White Heat Cold Logic (2008), edited by Paul Brown, Charlie Gere, Nicholas Lambert, and Catherine Mason, is a book about the history of British computer art during 1960–1980.

Overview
The book includes 29 contributed chapters by a variety of authors. The book was published in 2008 by MIT Press, in hardcover format. It also includes a series foreword by Sean Cubbitt, the editor-in-chief of the Leonardo Book Series.

Contributors
The following authors contributed chapters in the book:

Roy Ascott
Stephen Bell
Paul Brown
Stephen Bury
Harold Cohen
Ernest Edmonds
Maria Fernández
Simon Ford
John Hamilton Frazer
Jeremy Gardiner
Charlie Gere
Adrian Glew
Beryl Graham
Stan Hayward
Graham Howard
Richard Ihnatowicz
Malcolm Le Grice
Tony Longson
Brent MacGregor
George Mallen
Catherine Mason
Jasia Reichardt
Stephen A. R. Scrivener
Brian Reffin Smith
Alan Sutcliffe
Doron D. Swade
John Vince
Richard Wright
Aleksandar Zivanovic

Reviews
The book has been reviewed in a number of publications and online, including:

 Amazon.co.uk.
 BCS.
 Furtherfield.
 Leonardo.
 Realtime.
 Wired.

See also
 Event One computer art exhibition (1969)

References

External links
Amazon USA information
Amazon UK information

2008 non-fiction books
21st-century history books
Art history books
Case studies
Computer books
MIT Press books
History of computing
Computer art